Requiem for an Almost Lady is a studio album by Lee Hazlewood, released in 1971.

Critical reception

Stanton Swihart of AllMusic gave the album 4 stars out of 5, describing it as "one of the most beautifully agonizing breakup records to ever hit wax, culled from a composite of Hazlewood's relationships gone wrong."

Track listing

Personnel
Credits adapted from liner notes.

 Lee Hazlewood – vocals, arrangement, production
 Donnie Owens – rhythm guitar, arrangement
 Jerry Cole – guitar, bass guitar, sitar, arrangement
 Joe Cannon – guitar, harmonica
 Jim Walters – engineering
 Suzanne Jennings – executive production
 Pelle Metréus – design
 Ardy – cover painting

References

External links
 
 

1971 albums
Lee Hazlewood albums
Reprise Records albums
Light in the Attic Records albums